The S1 is a service on the Munich S-Bahn network. It is operated by DB Regio Bayern. It runs from Munich Airport station and Freising to Neufahrn bei Freising station, where most trains are coupled (and uncoupled in the opposite direction). Trains continue via Feldmoching, Laim, central Munich to Munich East.

The service is operated at 20-minute intervals between Munich Airport station and East Munich. Two out of three trains per hour continue from Neufahrn bei Freising to Freising, so that the headway between trains alternates between 20 and 40 minutes. It is operated using class 423 four-car electric multiple units, usually as two coupled sets. In the evenings and on Sundays they generally run as single sets.

The service runs over lines built at various times:
from Munich Airport to Neufahrn bei Freising over the Neufahrn Link, opened by Deutsche Bahn on 29 November 1998
from Freising to Laim over the Munich–Regensburg railway, opened by the Royal Bavarian Eastern Railway Company on 3 November 1858. The section from Feldmoching to a point to the east of Donnersbergerbrücke was relocated to the west on 28 September 1892.
from Laim to the approaches to Munich Central Station (Hauptbahnhof) over a section of the S-Bahn trunk line laid parallel to the Munich–Augsburg railway, opened by the Munich–Augsburg Railway Company on 1 September 1839
the underground section of the S-Bahn trunk line from the approaches to Munich Central Station to Munich East station, opened on 1 May 1971

Services to Munich Airport commenced on 29 November 1998.

Notes

Munich S-Bahn lines
1972 establishments in Germany